The Camden Confederate Monument, also known as the Confederate Women's Memorial, is located on the grounds of the Ouachita County Courthouse in Camden, Arkansas. The sculpture, carved out of Italian marble, depicts a woman dressed in the period of the American Civil War, standing with her feet together, clutching a flagpole. The sculpture is mounted on a block of North Carolina granite, next to a tall obelisk. The obelisk is inscribed on three sides, recognizing the valor of women in the Confederate cause, and the organizations that funded the memorial's construction. The memorial was erected in 1914 by the local chapters of the United Confederate Veterans and the United Daughters of the Confederacy.

The monument was listed on the National Register of Historic Places in 1996.

See also
National Register of Historic Places listings in Ouachita County, Arkansas

References

Cultural infrastructure completed in 1915
Buildings and structures in Camden, Arkansas
United Daughters of the Confederacy monuments and memorials in Arkansas
Monuments and memorials on the National Register of Historic Places in Arkansas
National Register of Historic Places in Ouachita County, Arkansas
Neoclassical architecture in Arkansas
Obelisks in the United States
1915 establishments in Arkansas
United Confederate Veterans